Caquiaviri Municipality is the second municipal section of the Pacajes Province in the  La Paz Department, Bolivia. Its seat is Caquiaviri.

See also 
 Achiri
 Jach'a Jawira
 Thujsa Jawira
 Qala Jawira
 Qullpa Jawira
 Q'awiri Qullu
 Utani Apu

References 
 www.ine.gov.bo / census 2001: Caquiaviri Municipality

External links 
 Map of the Pacajes Province

Municipalities of La Paz Department (Bolivia)